Joan Kennedy may refer to:
Joan Bennett Kennedy, American socialite, musician, author, model and first wife of U.S. Senator Ted Kennedy
Joan Kennedy (soldier), Canadian soldier
Joan Kennedy (musician), Canadian country music singer
Joan Kennedy Taylor (1926–2005), American writer and political activist